March 29 - Eastern Orthodox liturgical calendar - March 31

All fixed commemorations below are observed on April 12 by Orthodox Churches on the Old Calendar.

For March 30th, Orthodox Churches on the Old Calendar commemorate the Saints listed on March 17.

Saints

 Prophet Joad (III Kings 13:11), who dwelt in Bethel (10th century BC)
 Holy Apostles Sosthenes, Apollos, Cephas, Caesar, and Epaphroditus, of the Seventy (1st century)  (see also: December 8 and January 4)
 Saint Eubula, mother of St. Panteleimon (304)
 Venerable John the Hermit of Cilicia (4th century)
 Saint John II, Patriarch of Jerusalem (5th century)
 Venerable John the Silent (John Hesychastes), Bishop of Colonia (Taxara) in Armenia, and later a monk of St. Sabbas Monastery (558)  (see also: December 3)
 Venerable John Climacus of Sinai, author of The Ladder of Divine Ascent (615)
 Venerable Zosimas, Bishop of Syracuse (662)  (see also: January 21)

Pre-Schism Western saints

 Saint Quirinus, the jailer of Pope Alexander I, martyr (c. 117)
 Saint Regulus (Rieul), by tradition a Greek, he is honoured as the first Bishop of Senlis in France (c. 260)
 Saint Mamertinus of Auxerre, a monk and then Abbot of Sts Cosmas and Damian in Auxerre in France (c. 462)
 Saint Fergus, Bishop of Downpatrick in Ireland (6th century)
 Saint Pastor, Bishop of Orleans in France (6th century)
 Saint Tola of Clonard, Abbot and Bishop of Disert Tola in Meath in Ireland (c. 733)
 Saint Patto (Pacificus), Bishop of Werden in Germany (c. 788)
 Saint Clinius, a Greek monk of Monte Cassino, he became Abbot of St Peter's near Pontecorvo, where his relics were venerated.
 Saint Osburga of Coventry, Abbess and Virgin (c. 1015)

Post-Schism Orthodox saints

 New Hieromartyr Zachariah, Metropolitan of Corinth (1684)
 Saint Sophronius, Bishop of Irkutsk (1771)
 Saint Gabriel (Bănulescu-Bodoni), Metropolitan of Kishinev and Khotin, Moldova (1821)

Other commemorations

 The Meeting of the Mother of God and Saint Elizabeth (1st century)
 Translation of the relicts of the Martyr-King Edmund of East Anglia.
 Repose of Blessed Matrona (Mylnikova) the Barefoot, of St. Petersburg, Fool for Christ (1911)

Icon gallery

Notes

References

Sources
 March 30/April 12. Orthodox Calendar (PRAVOSLAVIE.RU).
 April 12 / March 30. HOLY TRINITY RUSSIAN ORTHODOX CHURCH (A parish of the Patriarchate of Moscow).
 March 30. OCA - The Lives of the Saints.
 The Autonomous Orthodox Metropolia of Western Europe and the Americas (ROCOR). St. Hilarion Calendar of Saints for the year of our Lord 2004. St. Hilarion Press (Austin, TX). p. 25.
 March 30. Latin Saints of the Orthodox Patriarchate of Rome.
 The Roman Martyrology. Transl. by the Archbishop of Baltimore. Last Edition, According to the Copy Printed at Rome in 1914. Revised Edition, with the Imprimatur of His Eminence Cardinal Gibbons. Baltimore: John Murphy Company, 1916. pp. 90–91.
 Rev. Richard Stanton. A Menology of England and Wales, or, Brief Memorials of the Ancient British and English Saints Arranged According to the Calendar, Together with the Martyrs of the 16th and 17th Centuries. London: Burns & Oates, 1892. p. 137.
Greek Sources
 Great Synaxaristes:  30 ΜΑΡΤΙΟΥ. ΜΕΓΑΣ ΣΥΝΑΞΑΡΙΣΤΗΣ.
  Συναξαριστής. 30 Μαρτίου. ECCLESIA.GR. (H ΕΚΚΛΗΣΙΑ ΤΗΣ ΕΛΛΑΔΟΣ). 
Russian Sources
  April 12 (30 March). Православная Энциклопедия под редакцией Патриарха Московского и всея Руси Кирилла (электронная версия). (Orthodox Encyclopedia - Pravenc.ru).
  30 марта (ст.ст.) 12 апреля 2013 (нов. ст.). Русская Православная Церковь Отдел внешних церковных связей. (DECR).

March in the Eastern Orthodox calendar